was a town located in Yamato District, Fukuoka Prefecture, Japan.

As of 2003, the town had an estimated population of 18,227 and a density of 1,079.16 persons per km². The total area was 16.89 km².

On March 21, 2005, Mitsuhashi, along with the town of Yamato (also from Yamato District), was merged into the expanded city of Yanagawa.

External links
 Yanagawa official website 

Dissolved municipalities of Fukuoka Prefecture
Populated places disestablished in 2005
2005 disestablishments in Japan